The Estadio P.R. Tapia is a multi-use stadium located in Chapingo, State of Mexico. It is currently used mostly for American football matches  The stadium has a capacity of 4,000 people.

References

External links

Multi-purpose stadiums in Mexico
P.R. Tapia
Athletics (track and field) venues in Mexico
College American football venues in Mexico